Chrysendeton chalcitis is a moth in the family Crambidae. It was described by Cajetan von Felder, Rudolf Felder and Alois Friedrich Rogenhofer in 1875. It is found in Colombia.

References

Acentropinae
Moths described in 1875